MTV Global (formerly as MTV Europe) is the international version of the American TV channel MTV as 24-hour music video and entertainment pay television network officially launched on 1 August 1987 as part of the worldwide MTV network.

Initially, MTV served all regions of Europe, being one of the few TV channels focused on the entire European market. At the moment, MTV serves a number of European countries, African, Asian, Oceanian, Middle Eastern, Latin American and Caribbean territories.

Over the years, MTV Global has been divided into many different channels for certain countries. Most countries in Europe, Asia, Oceania, Latin America and the Caribbean now have their own versions of the channel, and therefore MTV Global is now mostly available in those countries where there is no localized version of MTV.

History
On 1 August 1987 at 00:01 BST, MTV Europe officially launched with an Elton John concert in Amsterdam at the Roxy Club marked in conjunction with MTV celebrated its sixth anniversary. The first video clip shown on the air was "Money for Nothing" by Dire Straits. Moreover, the beginning and end of the clip were supplemented with the slogan "I want my MTV", voiced by Sting. The initiator of the launch of MTV in Europe was Robert Maxwell. Then his company Robert Maxwell Group with British Telecom and Viacom (the copyright holder of the "MTV" brand) in joint cooperation, the MTV Europe TV channel was created. The office was located in London at 40 Conduit St.

The channel was launched in the United Kingdom, Denmark, Finland, the Netherlands and Sweden, a year later MTV Europe expanded to West Germany, Belgium, Switzerland, Greece and Norway. The channel was immediately accepted into 1.6 million households.

The original line-up of VJs included presenters from Belgium, Denmark and France, as well as Ray Cokes and Steve Blame from the UK. Since that time, MTV has popularized such a profession as VJ.

At that time, such programs as MTV's Greatest Hits, Headbanger's Ball, MTV's Most Wanted, The Big Picture (a program about cinema), The Pulse (about fashion and style), 120 Minutes and MTV Coca-Cola Report (music news, interviews and tour dates of musicians) were produced.

In February 1988, MTV Europe moved to the Camden Town area at 20-23 Mandela St.

In October of the same year, the management of MTV Europe visited the Soviet Union for preliminary negotiations on the start of work. At the same time, an application for registration of the TV channel was submitted.

In 1989, MTV Europe covered the Moscow Music Festival live from the Lenin Stadium. At the same time, the TV channel started in East Berlin, East Germany.
Soviet artists officially debuted on MTV in the summer of 1989. The Moscow group "Cruise" released the Hit for MTV manifesto song at the same time.

In February 1990, MTV Europe was launched in Poland and Czechoslovakia. In the same year, Viacom bought the remaining 25% of shares from British Telecom.

In early 1991, Metromedia International Group together with Lencentel signed a contract with MTV Europe for 5 years, this is the first contract for broadcasting a foreign channel signed in the USSR. On March 8, 1991, the channel began broadcasting in Leningrad, and later in other major cities, which made it possible to become the first Western 24-hour channel that could be received in the USSR.

Nirvana led the rapid transition to the rise of alternative rock and grunge on MTV in 1991, releasing a video clip for the song "Smells Like Teen Spirit" by Nirvana.
In the early-mid-1990s, MTV added gangsta rappers with a less pop sound to its rotation, such as Tupac Shakur, The Notorious B.I.G., Wu-Tang Clan, Ice Cube, Warren G, Ice-T, Dr. Dre, Us and Snoop Dogg.

In August 1991, Viacom bought the remaining 50.1% of the shares from Robert Maxwell Group, because the London-based company was short of cash, and sold its assets as part of efforts to reduce debts accumulated during aggressive acquisitions in the 1980s.

By 1992, MTV Networks Europe had become the largest pan-European broadcasting company. MTV Europe was hosted by 38 million households in 28 countries.

In 1993, MTV Europe moved to a new office at 180 Oxford Street. But the programs were filmed at the Breakfast television center on 17-29 Hawley Crescent, which was completely bought out by MTV Networks Europe.

From 1990 to 1996, MTV programs were rebroadcast on the central TV channels of Russia – "VID", "ORT", "2x2", "TV-6", "Muz-TV" and others. Also from 1992 to 1994 on the Polish TV channel TVP1.

The channel launched the premieres of the following programs: Beavis and Butthead, Æon Flux, The Brothers Grunt, etc.

In 1994, the channel began holding the MTV Europe Music Awards ceremony. Every year the ceremony takes place in one of the major European cities.
On July 1, 1995, MTV Europe switched to pay TV broadcasting, and was also one of the first channels in Europe to start digital broadcasting.

In September, the channel was fined by the Independent Commission on Television Programs of Great Britain for a total of 60,000 pounds for showing obscenities, scenes of sadomasochism and similar things at a time of day when children could still be at the TV. In November of the same year, MTV Europe was hosted by 51.3 million households in 36 countries. At the end of 1995, Chello Zone became the distributor of the channel in Russia

In 1996–1997, two websites were launched – mtve.com and mtveurope.com.

Starting from the end of 1997, MTV gradually reduced the screening of video clips of rock music representatives, which led to the slogan among skeptics: "Rock is dead." The fact that at that time rock music fans were less materialistic and bought less music based on TV offers were cited as the reasons that the channel was breaking away from its once mainstream music. Instead, MTV began to devote its musical airtime mainly to pop and hip-hop/R&B music. All rock shows were eliminated, and the rock-related categories at the Video Music Awards were reduced to one.

At the dawn of the new millennium, in the period from 1997 to 2001, the animated series Daria in the genre of comedy drama, everyday life was released on the MTV channel.

MTV Networks Europe has rapidly begun to open local divisions of the MTV channel in some countries. So in March 1997, MTV Germany was launched. MTV UK & Ireland opened on July 1, then MTV Italy was launched in September.
MTV Nordic for Scandinavia was launched in June 1998, MTV Russia appeared on September 25. In 2000, other regional channels were launched – MTV France in June, followed by MTV Poland in July and MTV Spain and MTV Nederland in September. MTV Networks Europe continued to open local branches in other European countries. In the same year, another website appeared – mtv.tv

On April 1, 2002, MTV Europe was renamed to MTV European. At the same time, the channel began to abandon some of its programs in favor of American MTV shows. The channel significantly reduced the overall rotation of music videos during the 2000s. Similar trends were observed on other European MTV channels.

In 2004 and 2008, MTV continued to focus on reality shows, releasing projects 8th & Ocean, Laguna Beach, Next, The Hills, Two-A-Days, My Super Sweet 16, Parental Control and Viva la Bam featuring Bam Margera.

In 2007, MTV broadcast the reality show "A Shot at Love with Tila Tequila", which told about the sensational journey of Tila Tequila in search of her sex partner. Her bisexuality played a role in the concept of the show: both men and women competed for love.

In 2006–2007, MTV Turkey and MTV Ukraine were launched. In August 2007, the editorial department moved to Warsaw, but broadcasting continued from the London office. MTV European also expanded to South Africa and the Middle East.

On July 1, 2009, during the unified standardization of the design of the global MTV network, a new corporate identity was introduced, as well as a new design.

Since January 2010, MTV Networks Europe has started rebranding localized websites, creating standards for each country. In August, music programs disappeared from the air, and reality shows from the American branch of MTV began to be shown instead.

In 2010, the channel began broadcasting under a Czech license, since the Czech Republic has minimum broadcasting rules, it was chosen for licensing purposes in the EU. The broadcasting center is still located in London MTV European began to focus on viewers from 16 to 35 years old, the audience was more than 100 million people in 43 countries.

On July 1, 2011, the logo and design of the channel changed, the inscription "Music Television" disappeared from the logo. The former name MTV Europe has also returned.

In 2012, the channel moved to the Breakfast television center at 17-29 Hawley Crescent, from there all foreign TV channels of Paramount Networks are operated. At the same time, all music charts disappeared from the channel all music charts disappeared from the channel. At the beginning of 2013, three charts returned to the air of MTV Europe — Hitlist UK, Base Chart and Dance Floor Chart. At the same time, the channel covered 101 countries.

In the fall of 2014, the channel's website was transferred to the organizers of the MTV Europe Music Awards, now when switching to the website mtv.tv, redirects to the site tv.mtvema.com.

In the summer of 2015, MTV Europe reissued the inter-program screensavers of TV channels, focusing on the initiative MTVBump.com, and provided more social screensavers created by MTV viewers.

On March 1, 2016, MTV Europe switched to widescreen broadcasting (16:9).

In December 2017, MTV received a new design, similar to Latin American and Brazilian MTV. Other local MTV channels across Europe have also started using similar on-air branding.

Since June 2019, all music videos are broadcast only until 8:00 Central European time, with the exception of the Euro Top chart on Friday from 9 to 11:00.

In 2020 the editorial department moved to Amsterdam from Warsaw.

On January 26, 2021, MTV Europe has been renamed MTV Global, now the channel has the right to serve 111 countries of the world the channel is only available in those countries where there is no localized version of MTV, and in some countries the channel cannot broadcast due to conflicting content with local laws. MTV Global retains the Czech license (RRTV) in order to ensure the continuation of legal broadcasting in the European Union in accordance with the EU Audiovisual Media Services Directive (AVMSD) and the Single Market Law after the UK leaves the European Union. On September 14 of the same year, a rebranding was carried out, which included an updated version of the logo and a new design.

On August 1, 2022, in honor of the 35th anniversary of MTV Global, the first Bumper was shown.

On September 8 and 19, 2022, due to the death and funeral of Queen Elizabeth II, the TV channel removed all entertainment programs from the air. Two music blocks were introduced: "Programming Pause" and "Nothing but Music", which broadcast relaxed and gloomy music videos.

At the beginning of 2023, a new program "MTV Movies" was presented, it tells about the novelties of cinema.

Logo

Distribution
As of 2023, MTV Global broadcasts in the following territories:

Europe:

Albania
Andorra receives MTV Spain
Austria receives MTV Germany
Balkans
Belarus (with some localized content and advertising)
Belgium receives MTV (Netherlands & Flanders) or MTV France
Bosnia and Herzegovina
Bulgaria
Croatia
Cyprus 
Czech Republic
Denmark (with some localized content, advertising and subtitles)
Estonia
Finland (with some localized content, advertising and subtitles)
France receives MTV France
Germany receives MTV Germany
Greece 
Iceland
Ireland receives MTV Ireland
Italy receives MTV Italy
Israel receives MTV Israel
Hungary
Kosovo
Latvia
Liechtenstein receives MTV Germany
Lithuania (no longer served by any national cable provider, replaced by MTV Hits)
Luxembourg
Malta
Moldova (with some localized content and advertising)
Monaco receives MTV France
Montenegro
Netherlands receives MTV (Netherlands & Flanders)
North Macedonia
Norway (with some localized content, advertising and subtitles)
Poland receives MTV Poland
Portugal receives MTV Portugal
Romania
San Marino
Serbia
Slovakia
Slovenia
Spain receives MTV Spain
Sweden (with some localized content, advertising and subtitles)
Switzerland receives MTV Germany or MTV France
Turkey
United Kingdom receives MTV UK
Ukraine

Middle East:

Bahrain
Iraq
Jordan
Kuwait
Lebanon
Oman
Palestine
Qatar
Saudi Arabia
Syria
United Arab Emirates
Yemen

Africa:

Algeria
Angola
Benin
Botswana
Burkina Faso
Burundi
Chad
Djibouti
Egypt
Eritrea
Ethiopia
Eswatini
Gabon
The Gambia
Ghana
Guinea
Guinea-Bissau
South Africa receives MTV Africa
South Sudan
Cameroon
Cape Verde
Kenya
Comoros
Democratic Republic of the Congo
Republic of the Congo 
Lesotho
Liberia	
Libya
Madagascar
Malawi
Mali
Morocco
Mauritius
Mauritania
Mozambique
Namibia
Niger
Nigeria
Ivory Coast
Equatorial Guinea
Rwanda
Sahrawi Republic
Senegal
Seychelles
Sierra Leone
Central African Republic
São Tomé and Príncipe
Sudan
Somalia
Somaliland
Tanzania
Togo
Tunisia
Uganda
Zambia
Zimbabwe

Asia:

Armenia (with some localized content and advertising)
Azerbaijan (with some localized content and advertising)
Bangladesh
Georgia (with some localized content and advertising)
Hong Kong
Indonesia
Japan receives MTV Japan
Kazakhstan (with some localized content and advertising)
Kyrgyzstan (with some localized content and advertising)
Macau
Mainland China
Malaysia
Myanmar
Philippines
Singapore
South Korea
Sri Lanka
Tajikistan (with some localized content and advertising)
Taiwan
Thailand
Turkmenistan (with some localized content and advertising)
Uzbekistan (with some localized content and advertising)
Vietnam receives MTV Vietnam (replaced by Nick Jr. Vietnam on 1 January 2023)

Oceania:

Australia receives MTV Australia & NZ
Fiji
New Zealand receives MTV Australia & NZ
Papua New Guinea

Latin America:

Argentina
Bolivia
Brazil receives MTV Brazil
Colombia
Costa Rica
Chile
Ecuador
El Salvador
Guatemala
Honduras
México
Nicaragua
Panamá
Paraguay
Perú
República Dominicana
Uruguay
Venezuela.

Free-to-air satellite transmissions
MTV Germany was available FTA on Astra 19,2E, but it became encrypted on 1 January 2011. Until August 2015 the Italian MTV-station was free to air available on Eutelsat 12 West A. However, with the take-over of Sky Italia of this channel, it has been rebranded TV8. MTV Italia has become an exclusive Sky-channel only for subscribers. On 23 December 2017, MTV Germany turned itself into a free-to-air channel.

Programming

Current Local Music Shows
MTV Top 20 (formerly Euro Top Chart) (Fridays 8:25 to 11:40 CET, Saturday 9:55, Sunday 6:00)
MTV Breakfast Club (Weekdays 06:10 to 09:15 CET, daily 06:00 to 09:30)
MTV Night Videos
MTV Push

Former Local Shows
MTV News Daily Update
HitList UK
MTV Base Chart
MTV Only hits
MTV Dance Floor Chart
MTV Movies
MTV Asks
M is for Music

Award Shows and Live Music Specials
MTV Europe Music Awards
MTV Video Music Awards
MTV Movie Awards
MTV World Stage
Isle of MTV

Pan-International
Are You The One?
Catfish: The TV Show
MTV Cribs
Deliciousness 
Ex On The Beach
Ridiculousness 
Teen Wolf
The Valleys
Geordie Shore
Teen Mom
Teen Mom OG
True Life Crime
True Life Crime UK
The L.A. Complex
MTV World Stage
Young and Married
My Life on MTV
The Hills
Jersey Shore
Geordie Shore
Siesta Key
16 and Pregnant

Former shows

Past VJs 
 Ray Cokes (1987–1996) Cokes & Vanthilt, Ray's Requests, Most Wanted, X-Ray Vision, MTV at the Movies, The Big Picture, European Top 20, MTV's Greatest Hits
 Simone Angel (1990–1998) Party Zone, MTV Dance, Dance Floor, Club MTV, Dance Floor Chart, European Top 20, MTV's Greatest Hits, Dial MTV
 Paul King (1989–1994) MTV's Greatest Hits, 120 Minutes, MTV News, Morning Mix, HitList UK, XPO, First Look, Dial MTV
 Pip Dann (1988–1994) MTV Prime, Post Modern, MTV at the Movies, The Big Picture, Dial MTV, Music Non Stop, European Top 20, HitList UK, XPO, MTV's Greatest Hits, MTV Coca-Cola Report, MTV News, First Look, RockBlock
 Maiken Wexø (1987–1992; 1993) Pure Pop, MTV Coca-Cola Report, European Top 20, MTV News, XPO, MTV Prime
 Marcel Vanthilt (1987–1990; 1991) Cokes & Vanthilt, 120 Minutes, XPO, Most Wanted
 Sophie Bramly (1987–1991) Yo! MTV Raps
 Chris Salewicz (1987–1993) MTV News, Reverb
 Nunu (1990) Awake on the Wild Side
 Sonya Saul (1990-1992) MTV News, XPO
 Terry Christian (1991) XPO, Morning Mix
 Richie Rich (1993-1994) The Soul of MTV, MTV's Greatest Hits, HitList UK
 John Dunton-Downer (1987-1997) 120 Minutes, The Big Picture (producer)
 Steve Blame (1987–1994) MTV News, Reverb, Take the Blame, Pure Pop, MTV Coca-Cola Report, First Look
 Vanessa Warwick (1990–1997) Headbangers Ball, RockBlock
 Kristiane Backer (1989–1996) European Top 20, MTV Coca-Cola Report, MTV's Greatest Hits, Awake on the Wild Side, XPO, Party Zone, Headbangers Ball, RockBlock, MTV at the Movies
 Rebecca de Ruvo (1991–1995) Dial MTV, Awake on the Wild Side, MTV Prime, European Top 20
 Marijne van der Vlugt (1991–1996; 2013; 2015; 2016) The Pulse, MTV Coca-Cola Report, Alternative Nation, 120 Minutes, Post Modern, European Top 20, Dial MTV, Music Non Stop, MTV Europe Music Awards 2013-2015-2016-2022 (voice-over)
 Davina McCall (1987; 1992–1998) Hanging Out, HitList UK, MTV Coca-Cola Report, MTV's Greatest Hits, European Top 20, First Look, Music Non Stop, Most Wanted, Party Zone, MTV Dance, Cinematic, Singled Out, The End?
 Lisa I'Anson (1993–1996) The Soul of MTV, MTV News, HitList UK, Hanging Out, European Top 20, Music Non Stop, Party Zone
 Ingo Schmoll (1993–1996) Morning Mix, MTV News, First Look, MTV's Greatest Hits, European Top 20
 Enrico Silvestrin (1993–1997) Select MTV, Hanging Out, European Top 20, Dial MTV
 Hugo de Campos (1994–1997)  Stylissimo, Dial MTV, European Top 20, Music Non Stop, First Look, Hanging Out, The End?
 Maria Guzenina (1994–1997) KickStart, Awake on the Wild Side, Morning Mix, Music Non Stop, European Top 20, MTV's Greatest Hits, MTV Amour, MTV at the Movies
 Carolyn Lilipaly (1994–1998) MTV News, HitList UK, The Big Picture, MTV Winter Parties
 Miles Hunt (1994-1995) 120 Minutes
 John Kearns (1995–2012) MTV News, The Big Picture, MTV Europe Music Awards (voice-over)
 Toby Amies (1995–1999) Alternative Nation, MTV News, MTV Hot
 Eden Harel (1995–2000) European Top 20, Select MTV, Dance Floor Chart, Hanging Out, Dial MTV
 Kimsy von Reischach (1995-1998) First Look, European Top 20, MTV's Greatest Hits, MTV Winter Parties, Hanging Out
 Julia Valet (1996–1997) Superock, MTV Hot
 Nikolai (1996-1997) MTV's Greatest Hits, European Top 20, HitList UK, Morning Mix
 Boris (1996-1997) European Top 20, MTV Snowball, First Look
 Christian Ulmen (1996–1997) MTV Hot
 Crispin Somerville (1996-1997) Select MTV, HitList UK, Hanging Out
 Camila Raznovich (1996–1998) MTV Amour, Hanging Out, MTV Summer Festivals, MTV Beach House
 Lily Myrhed (1996-1998) HitList UK, MTV Winter Parties, Awake on the Wild Side, Morning Mix
 Lars Oostveen "Vico" (1996-1999) Select MTV, Dial MTV
 Thomas Madvig (1996-1999) Select MTV, MTV News
 Katja Schuurman (1997-2000) So 90's
 Melanie Sykes (1997) HitList UK
 Cat Deeley (1997–2002) HitList UK, Stylissimo, MTV News, MTV Amour, Dance Floor Chart
 Ulrika Eriksson (1998-2003) MTV News, Select MTV, HitList UK, Nordic Top 5, MTV:New, Morning Glory
 Kicki Berg (1998–2006) MTV News, Select MTV, European Top 20, Nordic Top 5, Dance Floor Chart, Top Selection, MTV Supermercado
 Trevor Nelson (1998-2004) The Lick
 Trey Farley (1999-2000) Select MTV, MTV News
 Lars Beckung (1999–2006) MTV:New, Select MTV, Nordic Top 5, MTV News, Morning Glory, MTV Source, This Is Our Music
 Neil Cole (2000–2004) The Fridge, MTV News, Select MTV, European Top 20, World Chart Express, MTV:New
 Joanne Colan (2000–2004) MTV News, European Top 20, MTV Movie Special, Select MTV, MTV:New, MTV Top 20 Countdown, MTV's Winterjam, MTV Presents
 Fleur van der Kieft (2000–2002) Top Selection, Select MTV
 Frederique Bedos (2001) Select MTV
 Erickka Jones (2001) MTV Top 20 Countdown
 Mimi Kalinda (2001-2002) Dance Floor Chart, World Chart Express, Top Selection, Select MTV, The Fridge
 Ina Geraldine (2003–2004) Euro Top 20
 Becky Griffin (2003-2005) Dance Floor Chart, World Chart Express
 Amelia Hoy (2004–2005) Euro Top 20, Up North
 Axl Smith (2004-2007) Spanking New, Axl Meets, MTV at the Festivals
 Pernille Fals Bahrt (2005-2007) MTV News
 Archie Archibald (2005-2006) MTV News
 Charlotte Thorstvedt (2005–2009) Euro Top 20, Spanking New
 Jason Danino-Holt (2006) Switched On
 Shire Raghe (2006-2009) MTV News, SuperStar Saturday
 Freya Clausen (2007-2009) Fahrenheit, Spanking New, MTV News, MTV Source
 Janika Nieminen (2008-2010) MTV Overdrive, SuperStar Saturday
 Matthew Bailey (2009–2010) Euro Top 20

See also
 MTV Live - MTV Networks high-definition television channel in International.

References

MTV
1980s fads and trends
1981 establishments in New York City
Companies based in New York City
English-language television stations in the United States
Music video networks in the United States
Race-related controversies in television
Television channels and stations established in 1981
Television networks in the United States
1985 mergers and acquisitions
Paramount Media Networks
Music television channels
MTV channels
English-language television stations
1987 establishments in the United Kingdom
English-language television stations in the United Kingdom
Television channels in the United Kingdom
Music video networks in the United Kingdom
HD-only channels